Helena Lake is a hamlet in the Rural Municipality of Parkdale No. 498 in the province of Saskatchewan, Canada.

Unincorporated communities in Saskatchewan
Parkdale No. 498, Saskatchewan
Division No. 17, Saskatchewan